Tod Robinson Caldwell (February 19, 1818July 11, 1874) was an American lawyer and the 41st governor of the U.S. state of North Carolina from 1871 until his death in Hillsborough in North Carolina in 1874. He was a son of John Caldwell (1779–1857) and Hannah Pickett Robinson (1794–1875).

He was born in Morganton, Burke County, North Carolina where he had a home for most of his life. Caldwell attended the University of North Carolina at Chapel Hill, graduating on June 4, 1840.  He was a member of the Dialectic Society. He was examined by the Supreme Court and admitted to Superior Court Practice (much like passing a bar examination) in June 1841, becoming solicitor for Burke County.  In 1842 he was elected a member of the North Carolina House of Commons in which he served two sessions.  In 1850 he represented Burke County in the state senate.  After the close of the Civil War he was a member of the Reconstruction Convention, and President of Western North Carolina Railroad.

Caldwell was elected the first lieutenant governor of North Carolina in 1868, the same year the state constitution had created the office. He became governor in 1871 upon the impeachment and conviction of Governor William Woods Holden.  Caldwell was elected governor in his own right in 1872, by about two thousand majority, becoming the second Republican elected governor of North Carolina. His areas of interest were the state debt and the state finances and the opening of the public schools which had been closed in 1863 due to lack of money. He appointed Alexander McIver as Superintendent of Public Instruction and got a bill passed allowing private aid for public schools in order to gain funds to reopen the schools.

Caldwell married Minerva Ruffin Cain on December 12, 1840. Tod and Minerva had at least four children:  Mary Ruffin Caldwell, wife of Dr. Waighstill Collett; John "Jack" Caldwell, killed at Gettysburg; Martha R. Caldwell, wife of Edward W. Ward; and Hannah J. Caldwell, wife of Walter Brem.

Shortly after arriving on July 9, 1874, at Hillsborough, Orange County, North Carolina to attend the railroad's stockholders' meeting, Caldwell became very ill and died unexpectedly two days later on July 11, 1874.  Newspaper reports stated he died from cholera morbus.  His body was returned to the state capital to lie in state after which his body was carried to Morganton and buried in the family plot in Forest Hill Cemetery.

References

External links
OurCampaigns.com: Political career of Tod R. Caldwell

1818 births
1874 deaths
People from Morganton, North Carolina
University of North Carolina at Chapel Hill alumni
North Carolina lawyers
Republican Party members of the North Carolina House of Representatives
Republican Party North Carolina state senators
Republican Party governors of North Carolina
Lieutenant Governors of North Carolina
Deaths from cholera
19th-century American politicians
19th-century American lawyers